Scilla may refer to the following people

Given name
Scilla Gabel (born 1938), Italian film, television and stage actress
Scilla Sclanizza (1926–2006), Italian screen and stage actress

Surname
Agostino Scilla (1629–1700), Italian painter, paleontologist and geologist
Fulco Luigi Ruffo-Scilla (1840–1895), Italian Cardinal of the Holy Roman Church
Guglielmo Scilla (born 1987), Italian actor and writer
Luigi Ruffo-Scilla (1750–1832), Italian Cardinal of the Holy Roman Church

See also
Scilla (disambiguation)
Scylla (disambiguation)
Priscilla
Silla (name)
Sillah
Sylla

Italian-language surnames